RFM SOMNII is a music festival held annually at Praia do Relógio in Figueira da Foz, Portugal, and is organized by RFM, a radio station. RFM SOMNII has almost a decade of stories and more than 600,000 visitors who already visited the biggest sunset ever, at one of the most beautiful beaches of the Portuguese coast, with access to the beach and to the sea.

The 2021 edition, which will feature 3 days of emotions and surprises, will highlight a very important element of nature’s balance: water.

Inspired by this element, Portugal’s largest beach festival and one of the largest in Europe will feature the best artists in the world and the most unforgettable experiences during 72 hours of endless music and animation.

The largest sunset concept ever appeared in 2012 and has been held since the second edition in Praia do Relógio, at Figueira da Foz - Portugal.

2012

2013

2014

2015

2016

2017

2018

2019

References

External links

 Website of the RFM SOMNII

Music festivals established in 2012
Electronic music festivals in Portugal
Summer events in Portugal